27:36 is the second EP released by Gregor Samsa in 2003, one year after their debut EP, Gregor Samsa. It features three untitled tracks which were later named by the band for easy reference, though those names are unofficial.

Track listing

Gregor Samsa
Champ Bennett – guitar, vocals
Nikki King – Rhodes piano, keyboard, vocals
Nick Wurz – bass guitar
Nathan Altice – guitar, keyboard
Earl Yevak – drums

External links
[ Preview 27:36 on All Music Guide]

Gregor Samsa (band) albums
2003 EPs